Dallas Leon Baker (born November 10, 1982) is a former American football wide receiver. Baker played college football for the University of Florida, and thereafter, he has played professionally for the Pittsburgh Steelers of the National Football League (NFL) and the Jacksonville Sharks of the Arena Football League (AFL). As a member of the Steelers, he won Super Bowl XLIII against the Arizona Cardinals. He is currently the wide receivers coach at Baylor University.

Early years 

Baker was born in New Smyrna Beach, Florida, and attended New Smyrna Beach High School, where he was a star wide receiver for the New Smyrna Beach Barracudas high school football team.  In 2001, he set the single season Barracudas' record with seventeen touchdowns, 67 catches and 1,142 yards  He attended Northfield Mount Hermon School for a postgraduate year. Dallas led NMH to the New England championship in football and was a standout player on NMH's basketball team. Baker graduated from NMH in 2002.

College career 

Baker accepted an athletic scholarship to attend the University of Florida in Gainesville, Florida, and played for coach Ron Zook and coach Urban Meyer's Florida Gators football teams from 2003 to 2006.  He originally signed to play for the Gators in February 2001 as a member of what would become coach Steve Spurrier's final recruiting class at Florida, but due to NCAA academic eligibility issues, Baker instead enrolled at Northfield Mount Hermon School, an elite preparatory school in Massachusetts, for one year.  While at Mt. Hermon, Baker led his team to the New England Championship game. After Spurrier left Florida for the NFL and Zook was hired to replace him, Baker stuck with Florida and enrolled as a partial-qualifier in 2002.

Urban Meyer's hiring at Florida three seasons later marked a turning point in Baker's career at Florida.  In 2005, he made fifty-six receptions, doubling his total from the previous season.  Afterward, Baker's college grades were good enough to earn back the year of eligibility lost to the partial qualification.

As a senior team captain in 2006, Baker delivered career highs for receptions (60), receiving yards (920), and receiving touchdowns (10), and was a first-team All-Southeastern Conference (SEC) selection.  Baker's 25-yard touchdown catch provided the winning margin in the Gators' 21–14 victory over the rival Florida State Seminoles.  The following week, the Gators defeated Arkansas to win the SEC Championship Game for the first time in six years.  The Gators would go on to rout the heavily favored Ohio State Buckeyes and capture their second national championship, with Baker catching a touchdown pass for the Gators first score in their 41–14 victory in the 2007 BCS National Championship Game.  Throughout his college career, the college football analysts on ESPN called him "Dallas Baker, Touchdown Maker," hearkening back to his nickname from his New Smyrna Beach High School days.

He graduated from the University of Florida in December 2006 with a bachelor's degree in health and human performance.

Professional career

Pittsburgh Steelers 
He was cut by the Steelers on September 1, 2007, but quickly re-joined the organization as a member of the practice squad on September 2.

Baker made the Steelers' 53-man roster out of training camp in 2008. He played in eight games, recording one catch for six yards, before being waived on November 15 to make room for cornerback Roy Lewis; the Steelers' re-signed Baker to their practice squad on November 19.

Baker signed a future contract with the Steelers in February 2009. He was released in final cuts on September 5, 2009.

Jacksonville Sharks 
Baker joined the Jacksonville Sharks of the Arena Football League in the early part of the 2010 season, making his AFL debut in the third game of the season against the Orlando Predators.

CFL 
Baker signed with the Montreal Alouettes of the CFL on April 5, 2011.
On August 8, 2011, he was traded to the Saskatchewan Roughriders for Luc Mullinder.

Coaching
Baker was the Wide Receivers Coach at Warner University, a Christian college in Lake Wales, Florida.
On March 10, 2017, Baker accepted the position of Wide Receivers Coach at Marshall University in Huntington, WV.

On May 15, 2021 Buffalo head coach Maurice Linguist hired Baker as Wide Receiver's Coach.

In January 2022, Baker was hired as the wide receivers coach by Dave Aranda at Baylor.

Football family 

Baker is the nephew of Wes Chandler, who is a former All-American Gator wide receiver, NFL standout and professional football coach. Baker's younger brother Perry Baker is a professional rugby sevens player and represented the USA in the 2016 Olympics.

See also
 2006 Florida Gators football team
 List of Pittsburgh Steelers players
 List of Florida Gators in the NFL Draft
 List of University of Florida alumni

References

Bibliography 

 Carlson, Norm, University of Florida Football Vault: The History of the Florida Gators, Whitman Publishing, LLC, Atlanta, Georgia (2007).  .

External links
  Saskatchewan Roughriders profile

1982 births
Living people
African-American coaches of American football
African-American players of American football
African-American players of Canadian football
American football wide receivers
Baylor Bears football coaches
Buffalo Bulls football coaches
Canadian football wide receivers
Coaches of American football from Florida
Florida Gators football players
Jacksonville Sharks players
Marshall Thundering Herd football coaches
Montreal Alouettes players
Northfield Mount Hermon School alumni
People from New Smyrna Beach, Florida
Pittsburgh Steelers players
Players of American football from Florida
San Antonio Talons players
Saskatchewan Roughriders players
Sportspeople from Volusia County, Florida
Warner Royals football coaches
21st-century African-American sportspeople
20th-century African-American people